Dharmananda Behera is a politician from Odisha. He was former Member of Legislative Assembly of Choudwar-Cuttack.

Early life
Dharmananda Behera was born in 1949 in a Hindu Gopal (Yadav) family. His father is Raj Kishore Behera.

References

1949 births
Living people
Odisha politicians
People from Cuttack district
Biju Janata Dal politicians